Dominika Červenková (born 18 May 1988 in České Budějovice) is a rhythmic gymnast from Czech Republic, who participated in 2004 Athens Olympic Games.

Biography

Červenková started gymnastics at the age of four. Since her earliest years she has made a great impression on the Czech rhythmic gymnastics, which had failed to qualify at least one other athlete for the 2000 Olympics.

Under the guidance of coach Ivana Pokorná, she joined the senior national team in 2003. She finished second all-around in the national championships to Kateřina Kopáčová and won her first senior title with ball. She however beat the Czech number one in the Budapest World Championships that served as the qualification event for the 2004 Olympics. Červenková finished 18th in the qualification round and slipped down to 25th in the final all-around, but it was enough to secure the Czech Republic one Olympic spot.

In 2004 Červenková won her first all-around national title and confirmed herself as the third gymnast to represent the Czech Republic (first one since Lenka Oulehlová and Andrea Šebestová finished 22nd and 28th respectively in the 1996 Summer Olympics in Atlanta). Being only 16 years old, Červenková was the youngest member of the Czech Olympic team for Athens, as well as the tiniest one (only 1.60m tall). Struggling with her last hoop routine she finished 20th in the all-around qualification, but was warmly applauded by the audience.

In Baku, Červenková competed again in the world championships in 2005, 16th all-around final. She also took participation in the 2005 World Games in Duisburg, the individual apparatus substitute event to the Olympic Games recording the best result of ninth place with ribbon, only 0.05 pts out of final.

In 2006, Červenková had planned to take full advantage of her past results, particularly in the European Championships, though due to injury, had to withdraw from a large part of the season in favour of intensive rehabilitation. She thus missed the major part of the season, including the Europeans. In January 2007 the Czech Rhythmic Gymnastics Union board decided to discard Červenková from the national team following advice from the sport-medicine consultants.

Červenková is known for her tender and dynamic routines, nice body lines and appropriate flexibility balance, but she lacks the courage to risk and sometimes makes major mistakes. Fans love her for her charming and friendly character and smile.

Right now she still competing, but only in national competitions.

Trivia
Anna Bessonova of Ukraine is her favorite gymnast while javelin thrower and three-time Olympic champion Jan Železný is her favorite non-gymnastics athlete.

Achievements
2003 World Championships: 16th team, 25th A-A
2004 European Championships: 18th A-A
2004 Olympic Games: 20th A-A
2005 European Championships: 11th team, 15th A-A
2005 World Championships: 16th A-A, 14th rope, 17th ribbon, 19th ball, 21st clubs
2005 World Games: 9th ribbon, 12th ball and rope, 14th clubs

External links
International Federation of Gymnastics' profile on Dominika Červenková

Footnotes

1988 births
Living people
Czech rhythmic gymnasts
Gymnasts at the 2004 Summer Olympics
Olympic gymnasts of the Czech Republic
Sportspeople from České Budějovice